= 1st Armored Regiment (Lebanon) =

- The 1st Armored Vehicles Regiment
- Disbanded: 01/07/2005
- Allegiance: Lebanese Armed Forces
- Branch: Lebanese Army
- Role: Defending against Israeli attacks; Fighting smuggling; Maintaining stability and government authority
- Size: Unknown
- Colors: Brown, green and black

The 1st Armored Regiment was a regiment in the Lebanese Armed Forces. It was established in 2005. Its mission was to fight Israeli troops, fight smugglers, support other security forces, and increase the stability of the nation, among other tasks.
